Sub Dub Micromachine (AKA SDMM) is a German metal band. They gained fame through heavy airplay on the internet radio station ChroniX Aggression. Their music has been heavily influenced by groups like Korn and Fear Factory and includes low-tuned guitars, slap bass, and mixing vocal styles, like singing, growling and rapping. They are largely an industrial metal band, but because of this, their musical genre varies, and can be categorized as nu metal, alternative metal, and groove metal.

Discography

2002 Rabautz!

Track listing
 Break The Rules
 Bullshit
 Eternal Fight
 Jahrhundertstaender
 Last Resort
 Legoland Brennt
 Looza
 No Return
 Recognize Yourself
 Renegades
 So Far
 Wake Up
 Xavy Metal

2008 Auferstanden!

Track listing
 Power's Cummin' Home
 Don't bring Me Down
 Road To Nowhere
 Naked
 Fly
 Pump Up The Blast
 No Time
 Slave of My Mind
 Bomb TV Down
 Truth Is A Lie
 Grobschlaechter
 BONUS Road to Nowhere Video

2016 Settle For Force

Track listing
 How Deep Is Your Hate?
 DOOMED
 Shut The Fuck Up And Die
 As Soon As You Were Dead
 Morning Star
 Unkind Exit
 No Pain – No Gain
 M:A:O:A
 Settle For Force
 Her Scorn Is Out Of Breath
 Burning Fears
 S.D.M.M.

Current band members
 Kirk DeBurgh – Guitar, Vocals
 H-Beta – Bass
 Marcello Goldhofer – Drums

External links
Official Site
Official Fansite
Interview at DeutscheMusikland

German musical groups